opened in Masuda, Shimane Prefecture, Japan, in 1990.

See also
 List of Cultural Properties of Japan - paintings (Shimane)
 List of Historic Sites of Japan (Shimane)
 List of Museums in Shimane Prefecture

References

External links
  Sesshū Memorial Museum

Museums in Shimane Prefecture
Art museums and galleries in Japan
Masuda, Shimane
Museums established in 1990
1990 establishments in Japan